Kök-Moynok-1 — is a village in the Issyk-Kul Region of Kyrgyzstan. Its population was 1,015 in 2021.

References

Populated places in Issyk-Kul Region